Kendall Christopher Fuller (born February 13, 1995) is an American football cornerback for the Washington Commanders of the National Football League (NFL). He played college football at Virginia Tech and was drafted by the Washington Commanders, then known as the Redskins, in the third round of the 2016 NFL Draft. Fuller also played for the Kansas City Chiefs, where he recorded the game-sealing interception in their Super Bowl LIV victory over the San Francisco 49ers.

Early years
Fuller attended Our Lady of Good Counsel High School in Olney, Maryland, where he played football and ran track. On the football varsity, he was teammates with Blake Countess and Stefon Diggs. As a senior, he was the U.S. Army All-American Defensive Player of the Year and the Maryland Gatorade Football Player of the Year after he totaled 44 receptions for 695 yards and seven touchdowns on offense, and three interceptions, eight pass breakups and 28 tackles (including a sack) on defense.

In track & field, Fuller competed in hurdles and jumps, posting bests of 17.94 seconds in the 110m hurdles, 47.81s in the 300m hurdles, 6.48 meters (21 feet, 2.5 inches) in the long jump and 13.71m (45 feet) in the triple jump.

Fuller was a five-star recruit by Rivals.com and was ranked as the second best cornerback and ninth best player overall in his class. He committed to Virginia Tech in July 2012 to play college football, over offers from Alabama, Clemson, Florida, Michigan, Ohio State, Ole Miss, and South Carolina, among others.

College career
As a true freshman in 2013, Fuller started 12 of 13 games, recording 58 tackles and six interceptions. For his play he was named the ACC Defensive Rookie of the Year. Fuller returned as a starter his sophomore season in 2014. On December 15, 2015, Fuller declared for the 2016 NFL Draft.

College statistics

Professional career
Fuller attended the NFL Scouting Combine, but was unable to perform any physical drills due to a torn meniscus he suffered in the fall. Before his meniscus tear, Fuller was projected to be a first round pick by NFL draft experts and scouts. Fuller was ranked the fifth best cornerback prospect in the draft by DraftScout.com, the ninth best cornerback by NFL analyst Mike Mayock, and was ranked the 10th best defensive back prospect by Sports Illustrated.

Washington Redskins
The Washington Redskins selected Fuller in the third round (84th overall) of the 2016 NFL Draft. Fuller was the 14th cornerback selected in 2016.

2016
On June 2, 2016, the Washington Redskins signed Fuller to a four-year, $3.12 million contract that includes a signing bonus of $718,424.

Throughout training camp, he competed against Quinton Dunbar, Greg Toler, and Dashaun Phillips to be the third cornerback on the Redskins' depth chart. Head coach Jay Gruden named Fuller the fifth cornerback on the depth chart to start the regular season, behind Josh Norman, Bashaud Breeland, Quinton Dunbar, and Greg Toler.

He was inactive for the first three games (Weeks 1-3) and made his professional regular season debut in Week 4 after injuries to Bashaud Breeland and Quinton Dunbar. On October 2, 2016, Fuller earned his first career start and recorded a season-high eight combined tackles during a 31–20 victory against the Cleveland Browns. Fuller surpassed Greg Toler on the depth chart after Week 7 and became their fourth cornerback. In Week 8, he tied his season-high of seven solo tackles in the Redskins' 37 - 37 tie at the Cincinnati Bengals. After struggling in Week 13, Fuller was replaced by Greg Toler after defensive coordinator Joe Barry demoted him to the fifth cornerback on the depth chart.

2017

Fuller entered training camp slated as the starting nickelback, but saw competition from rookies Fabian Moreau, Josh Holsey, and veteran Dashaun Phillips. Defensive coordinator Greg Manusky named Fuller the starting nickelback and the third cornerback on the depth chart to begin the regular season, behind starters Josh Norman and Bashaud Breeland.

On September 24, 2017, Fuller recorded three combined tackles, deflected a pass, and made his first career interception off a pass by Derek Carr during a 27–10 victory against the Oakland Raiders. In Week 6, he made a solo tackle, a season-high two pass deflections, and intercepted a pass by quarterback C. J. Beathard in the last ten seconds of the Redskins' 26–24 victory against the San Francisco 49ers. On November 23, 2017, Fuller deflected a pass and recorded another victory-sealing interception against Eli Manning in the last 1:16 of the Redskins' 20–10 victory against the New York Giants. In Week 15, he collected a season-high eight combined tackles and two pass deflections during a 20–15 win against the Arizona Cardinals. He finished the  season with 55 combined tackles (43 solo), ten pass deflections, and four interceptions in 16 games and 16 starts.

Kansas City Chiefs

2018
On January 30, 2018, the Washington Redskins agreed to trade Fuller and a third round pick (78th overall) in the 2018 NFL Draft to the Kansas City Chiefs for quarterback Alex Smith. The trade was officially completed on March 14, the start of the new league year.

Fuller became the No. 1 cornerback on the Kansas City Chiefs’ depth chart after Marcus Peters was traded to the Los Angeles Rams. Head coach Andy Reid named Fuller and Steven Nelson the starting cornerbacks to begin the regular season.

On December 14, 2018, Fuller underwent surgery on his wrist and was inactive for the Chiefs’ Week 16 loss at the Seattle Seahawks. He finished the season with 82 combined tackles (64 solo), 12 pass deflections, and two interceptions in 15 games and 15 starts.

2019
In Super Bowl LIV against the San Francisco 49ers, Fuller made a handful of crucial plays late in the 4th quarter including a critical pass deflection and an interception off a pass thrown by Jimmy Garoppolo that helped the Chiefs secure the victory.

Washington Football Team / Commanders

2020
On March 23, 2020, Fuller signed a four-year, $40 million contract with the Washington Commanders, still known as the Redskins at the time. Fuller recorded two interceptions in a Week 4 game against the Baltimore Ravens. He finished the season with 50 tackles and four interceptions.

2021

Fuller recorded his first interception of the 2021 season against Kansas City Chiefs quarterback Patrick Mahomes in Week 6. In Week 12 against the Seattle Seahawks, he intercepted Russell Wilson on a two-point conversion attempt in the fourth quarter which sealed Washington's 17-15 win. On December 14, 2021, he was placed on the COVID-19 reserve list and was forced to miss the Week 15 game against the Philadelphia Eagles. He was placed back on the active roster on December 24.

2022
In Week 11, Fuller scored his first career touchdown on an interception return off of Houston Texans quarterback Davis Mills. The following week against the Atlanta Falcons, Fuller intercepted Marcus Mariota in the end zone with 58 seconds left to seal Washington's 19-13 victory. In Week 18, Fuller recorded his second career touchdown on an interception return off of Dallas Cowboys quarterback Dak Prescott.

Personal life
Fuller's three older brothers, Vincent, Corey and Kyle, all played college football at Virginia Tech and in the NFL as well.

References

External links

 
 Washington Commanders bio
 Virginia Tech Hokies bio

1995 births
Living people
American football cornerbacks
Kansas City Chiefs players
People from Olney, Maryland
Players of American football from Baltimore
Sportspeople from Montgomery County, Maryland
Virginia Tech Hokies football players
Washington Commanders players
Washington Football Team players
Washington Redskins players